The Miwok or Miwokan languages, also known as Moquelumnan or Miwuk, are a group of endangered languages spoken in central California by the Miwok peoples, ranging from the Bay Area to the Sierra Nevada. There are seven Miwok languages, four of which have distinct regional dialects. There are a few dozen speakers of the three Sierra Miwok languages, and in 1994 there were two speakers of Lake Miwok. The best attested language is Southern Sierra Miwok, from which the name Yosemite originates. The name Miwok comes from the Northern Sierra Miwok word miw·yk meaning 'people' or 'Indians.'

Languages
Language family by Mithun (1999):
Eastern Miwok
Plains Miwok †
Bay Miwok ( Saclan) †
Sierra Miwok
Northern Sierra Miwok (†) (Camanche, Fiddletown, Ione, and West Point dialects)
Central Sierra Miwok (nearly extinct) (East Central and West Central dialects)
Southern Sierra Miwok (nearly extinct) (Yosemite, Mariposa, and Southern dialects)
Western Miwok
Coast Miwok † (Bodega and Marin dialects)
Lake Miwok †

Proto-language
Reconstructions of Proto-Miwok plant and animal names by Callaghan (2014):

{| class="wikitable sortable"
|+ Proto-Miwok animal names
! Gloss !! Proto-Miwok
|-
| coyote || *ʔole
|-
| wolf || *hu·n, *hun·u-
|-
| antelope, bighorn || *ha·lu-ṣ
|-
| pocket gopher || *syw·yt
|-
| dog || *haju
|-
| chicken hawk || *suj·u
|-
| duck hawk || *wek-wek
|-
| fish hawk || *tuk-tuk
|-
| California condor || *mol·uk ?
|-
| great horned owl || *tuk·u-·li
|-
| barn owl || *wič·iki-ṣ
|-
| burrowing owl || *ṭok(·)ok...
|-
| valley quail || *hek...
|-
| roadrunner || *ʔuj(·)uj u, *ʔu·juju ?
|-
| kingfisher || *ča·ṭa·-ṭa-
|-
| pileated woodpecker || *pak-pak
|-
| California woodpecker || *palaṭ·ak
|-
| lesser snow goose || *wa·wo ?
|-
| goose spp. || *low·ot ?
|-
| lizard || *pit·e-·li ?
|-
| frog, sound of frog || *waṭa·k ?
|-
| grasshopper || *ko·ṭo ?
|-
| head louse || *ke·t, *ket·y-
|-
| flea || *ky(·)ky-ṣ
|-
| spider || *pok·um
|-
| body louse || *čypsi
|-
| scorpion || *ʔet·ym
|}

{| class="wikitable sortable"
|+ Proto-Miwok plant names
! Gloss !! Proto-Miwok
|-
| mountain pine and nuts || *san(·)ak
|-
| pine nuts, nuts || *ṣanak
|-
| gray pine and nuts || *sa·k, *sak·y
|-
| cedar, cypress || *mo·nuk ?
|-
| valley oak, tree || *ʔalwaṣ, ʔala·waṣ
|-
| live oak || *sa·ṭa
|-
| small oak tree || *su·k ?
|-
| white oak || *mol·a, *mo·la
|-
| maple || *ṣa·ji
|-
| buckeye (tree and fruit) || *ʔu·nu
|-
| tree alder || *sot·um ?
|-
| elderberry tree/fruit || *ʔantaj
|-
| manzanita (tree and berries) || *ʔe·je, *ʔej·e
|-
| Sierra gooseberry || *ki·li
|-
| poison oak || Proto-Utian *nykys
|-
| brush || *lim·e
|-
| wormwood (sage herb) || *kičin
|-
| grapes || *mut(·)e
|-
| black basket root || *mul·a
|-
| root, basket root (Carex spp.) || *su·li
|-
| Indian potato (Brodiaea spp.) || *wa·la
|-
| tea plant || *huk...
|-
| jimson weed || ?
|}

Further reading
 Freeland, Lucy S. 1947. "Western Miwok Texts with Linguistic Sketch". International Journal of American Linguistics 13:31-46.
 Freeland, Lucy Shepherd. 1951. Language of the Sierra Miwok. Waverly Press.
 Freeland, Lucy Shepherd and Broadbent, Sylvia M. 1960. Central Sierra Miwok Dictionary with Texts. University of California Press. https://www.yosemite.ca.us/library/central_sierra_miwok_dictionary/.
 Broadbent, Sylvia M., and Callaghan, Catherine A. 1960. "Comparative Miwok: A Preliminary Survey." International Journal of American Linguistics, vol. 26, no. 4: 301–316.
 Broadbent, Sylvia M., and Pitkin, Harvey. 1964. "A Comparison of Miwok and Wintun." In Studies in Californian Linguistics, ed. W. Bright, 19–45. University of California Publications in Linguistics, vol. 34. Berkeley: University of California Press.
 Broadbent, Sylvia M. 1964. The Southern Sierra Miwok Language. University of California Press, publications in linguistics (Vol. 38). Berkeley: University of California Press. https://www.yosemite.ca.us/library/southern_sierra_miwok_language/title.html.
 Callaghan, Catherine A. 1965. Lake Miwok Dictionary. University of California Press.
 Callaghan, Catherine A. 1970. Bodega Miwok Dictionary. Publications in Linguistics 60. University of California Press.
 Berman, Howard. 1982. Freeland's Central Sierra Miwok Myths. Survey of California and Other Indian Languages. https://escholarship.org/uc/item/1gx6543n.
 Callaghan, Catherine A. 1984. Plains Miwok Dictionary. Publications in Linguistics 105. University of California Press.
 Keeling, Richard. 1985. "Ethnographic Field Recordings at Lowie Museum of Anthropology." Robert H. Lowie Museum of Anthropology, University of California, Berkeley. v. 2. North-Central California: Pomo, Wintun, Nomlaki, Patwin, Coast Miwok, and Lake Miwok Indians.
 Callaghan, Catherine A. 1987. Northern Sierra Miwok Dictionary. Publications in Linguistics 110. University of California Press.
 Sloan, Kelly Dawn. 1991. Syllables and Templates: Evidence from Southern Sierra Miwok. Ph.D. thesis, MIT.

References

External links 
Miwok language keyboards, Languagegeek

Miwok
Utian languages